The 53rd Golden Horse Awards (Mandarin:第53屆金馬獎) took place on November 26, 2016, at the Sun Yat-sen Memorial Hall in Taipei, Taiwan. Organized by the Taipei Golden Horse Film Festival Executive Committee, the awards honored the best films of 2015–16. The ceremony was televised in Taiwan by TTV. Matilda Tao was the host of the ceremony.

Winners and nominees 
Winners are listed first, highlighted in boldface.

References

External links

 Official website of the Golden Horse Awards

53rd
2016 film awards
2016 in Taiwan